This is a list of National Cycle Routes in Zone 8 of the numbering scheme. Known as the Lôn Las Cymru, fully open and signed between Cardiff and Holyhead (Anglesey) via Brecon, Builth Wells, Machynlleth, Porthmadog and Bangor.

Single- and double-digits

Triple-digits

References

National Cycle Network